Cerithiopsis gemmulosa is a species of sea snail, a gastropod in the family Cerithiopsidae, which is known from the Gulf of Mexico and the Caribbean Sea. It was described by C. B. Adams, in 1850.

Description 
The maximum recorded shell length is 5.3 mm.

Habitat 
Minimum recorded depth is 0 m. Maximum recorded depth is 91 m.

References

gemmulosa
Gastropods described in 1850